Tony Trov (born Anthony Trovarello 1983) is an American film maker, comic book creator and musician best known for the independent horror comedy Alpha Girls.

Early life
Tony Trov is a native of Philadelphia PA and graduated from Girard Academic Music Program in 2001. Afterwards, he attended Temple University obtaining a degree in Mass Media.

Career
Trov's career started with film and television productions in the art department. Most notably TLC's Trading Spaces and several Bollywood films. 

In 2008, along with co-writer Johnny Zito, he won the March Zuda Comics competition with The Black Cherry Bombshells. The duo's sophomore effort, La Morté Sisters, was also purchased by Zuda Comics in 2009. Both comics were nominated for Harvey Awards in the Best Online Comic Category; 2009 and 2011 respectively.

When Zuda Comics dissolved in 2010, The Black Cherry Bombshells and La Morté Sisters were migrated to the DC Online imprint along with several other popular titles.

In 2009 Trov and Zito teamed with Comixology to digitally distribute a mini-series based on their self-published comic Carnivale De Robotique.
Trov and Zito's digital comic based on the public domain character Moon Girl was digitally distributed through Comixology before being printed by Red5 Comics in spring of 2011.

In 2010 they began digitally distributing the space-horror comic D.O.G.S. of Mars through Comixology, followed by a print edition by Image Comics. The comic has also been optioned as a film by High Treason Pictures.

Their production company, South Fellini, released their first feature film, Alpha Girls in 2013 through Gravitas Ventures. In 2015, production began on a second feature film, American Exorcist.
 
Trov also has performed with different music acts on bass guitar. He is a founder and songwriter of Fat City Reprise and performed with The Swimmers in 2008.
 In 2011, he began performing with psychedelic band Southwork on tenor saxophone.

Films
 Alpha Girls – 2013
 American Exorcist – 2018

Comics
DC Entertainment:
The Black Cherry Bombshells (2008- 2011)
La Morté Sisters (2009- 2011)

Comixology
Carnivale De Robotique (2010)

Red 5 Comics
Moon Girl (2011- 2013)

Image Comics
D.O.G.S. of Mars (2012)

Music
 Live at Grape Street Pub - 2004 - Fat City Reprise - Bass
 Arise - 2012 Southwork - Tenor Saxophone
 Seasons Passing EP - 2013 Southwork - Tenor Saxophone
 Wear Your Heart Out - 2014 Southwork - Tenor Saxophone

References

American comics writers
American comics artists
American people of Italian descent
Living people
1983 births
American webcomic creators